Marcel Höhlig (born April 14, 1979 in Rodewisch) is a Nordic combined athlete from Germany who has competed since 2000. He won a silver medal at the 2002 Winter Olympics in the 4 x 5 km team Competition.

External links
 
 

1979 births
Living people
People from Rodewisch
People from Bezirk Karl-Marx-Stadt
Sportspeople from Saxony
Nordic combined skiers at the 2002 Winter Olympics
Olympic silver medalists for Germany
Olympic medalists in Nordic combined
Medalists at the 2002 Winter Olympics